Daughters of Destiny is a 2017 English-language original Netflix documentary series created by Oscar-winning filmmaker Vanessa Roth. It follows a group of disadvantaged children in rural India enrolled in the Shanti Bhavan residential school located in Tamil Nadu, India.

Premise
Daughters of Destiny is shot over seven years, and follows a group of girls from rural India who are denied education because of their caste.

Cast
 Shilpa Anthony Raj
 Abraham George
 Ajit George
 Mariam George

Release
It was released on July 28, 2017 on Netflix streaming.

References

External links
 
 
 

Netflix original documentary television series
English-language Netflix original programming